Washington Township is an inactive township in Franklin County, in the U.S. state of Missouri.

Washington Township takes its name from the community of Washington, Missouri.

References

Townships in Missouri
Townships in Franklin County, Missouri